"Mercedes-Benz" is a single released by Ghanaian British musician Sway from The Delivery Mixtape. The single was released on 25 October 2009. It peaked at number 53 on the UK Singles Chart.

Track listing
UK Digital download
 "Mercedes-Benz" (Radio Edit) - 3:14
 "Silver & Gold" (2010 Remix) [feat. Akon & Tinchy Stryder] - 3:51

Chart performance

Release history

References

2009 singles
2009 songs
Sway (musician) songs